Istiblennius lineatus, the lined rockskipper, is a species of combtooth blenny found in coral reefs in the Pacific and Indian oceans. It is also commonly known as the lined blenny, black-lined blenny, or thin-lined rockskipper. It can reach a maximum of  TL. This species can be found in the aquarium trade.

References

lineatus
Fish described in 1836